The 1869 Caithness by-election was fought on 26 August 1869.  The by-election was fought due to the resignation of the incumbent MP of the Liberal Party, George Traill.  It was won by the Liberal candidate Sir John Sinclair, Bt.

References

1869 elections in the United Kingdom
1869 in Scotland
1860s elections in Scotland
By-elections to the Parliament of the United Kingdom in Scottish constituencies
Politics of the county of Caithness
August 1869 events